Suzanne DiMaggio is long-time analyst of U.S. Foreign Policy in Asia and the Middle East and a leading practitioner of Track II diplomacy. Her work is especially focused on U.S. relations with Iran and North Korea.

Early life
DiMaggio's mother was Japanese and her father Italian. DiMaggio has a B.A. in international business from New York University and an M.A. in international relations from City College of New York (CUNY).

Career

From 1993-98, she was a program officer at the United Nations University. From 1998-2007, DiMaggio was the vice president of Policy Programs at the United Nations Association of the United States. In 2002, she began facilitating  a high-level dialogue with European states, Iran, and the United States.

From 2007-14, she was the vice president of Global Policy Programs at the Asia Society. From 2014-2018, DiMaggio was a senior fellow at New America (organization) (2014-2018). 

DiMaggio is a Senior Fellow at the Carnegie Endowment for International Peace. She directs the U.S.-Iran Initiative and a U.S.-DPRK dialogue. She is also an Associate Senior Fellow in the SIPRI Disarmament, Arms Control and Non-proliferation Programme. DiMaggio also directs the IranProject.

In 2017, when the Trump administration had limited contact with North Korea, one report described DiMaggio as "a de facto ambassador for the United States" to North Korea. She favored a diplomatic resolution rather than force-based and militarized pathways. She described her philosophy: “Negotiating with the enemy is extremely difficult, but it's not impossible.”

DiMaggio is a co-founder and the former chair of the Quincy Institute for Responsible Statecraft. A key aim, in her words, was "to push back on the mindset that leads to and facilitates endless war."

Personal life
DiMaggio resides in New York City's Greenwich Village with her husband, Ben Allison, and daughter.

Bibliography
 "Selecting the Next Secretary-General," Foreign Service Journal, September 2006, pages 40-46.
 "Obama's Iranian challenge," The Guardian, November 13, 2008, https://www.theguardian.com/commentisfree/2008/nov/13/iran-usforeignpolicy.
 "Dealing with North Korea: Lessons from the Iran Nuclear Negotiations," Arms Control Today, Vol. 47, No. 6, (Jul/Aug 2017).
 Suzanne DiMaggio and Joel S. Wit, "How Trump Should Talk to North Korea," New York Times, November 7, 2017, https://www.nytimes.com/2017/11/07/opinion/trump-north-korea-talk.html.
 Suzanne DiMaggio and Gary Sick, "If Trump shreds the Iran deal, it'll be a huge geopolitical mistake," New York Daily News, May 2, 2018, https://www.nydailynews.com/opinion/shredding-iran-deal-huge-geopolitical-mistake-article-1.3965451.
 Suzanne DiMaggio and Thomas R. Pickering, "Correcting course on Iran: Trump has left us painfully isolated; it's time to reorient our foreign policy," New York Daily News, February 5, 2019, https://www.nydailynews.com/opinion/ny-oped-correcting-course-on-iran-20190204-story.html.

References

External links
 
 
 Interview, "Talks Between U.S. And North Korean Leaders Would Be Historic," National Public Radio, March 9, 2018.
 "PODCAST: Suzanne DiMaggio’s “Unofficial” Diplomacy With North Korea and Iran Have Led to Major Breakthroughs," April 16, 2018.

American people of Japanese descent
American people of Italian descent
New York University Stern School of Business alumni
City College of New York alumni
Year of birth missing (living people)
Living people